Changing Woman is an album by Buffy Sainte-Marie, released in 1975 via MCA Records. It was her second, and last, album for the label.

Critical reception
Record Collector wrote that the album recalled Sainte-Marie's Vanguard years, and praised Norbert Putnam's "more adventurous arrangements and production."

Track listing
All songs written by Buffy Sainte-Marie except where noted.

 "Eagle Man/Changing Woman" – 3:08
 "Can't You See The Way I Love You" – 3:00
 "Love's Got to Breathe and Fly" – 2:50
 "You Take Me Away" – 3:14
 "'Til I See You Again" – 3:08
 "Mongrel Pup" – 3:19
 "The Beauty Way" – 2:15
 "Nobody Will Ever Know It's Real But You" (Norbert Putnam, Buffy Sainte-Marie) – 3:01
 "All Around The World" – 3:46
 "A Man" – 2:58

References

Changing Woman
Changing Woman
Albums produced by Norbert Putnam
Changing Woman